Yevgeni Anatolyevich Blokhin (born May 29, 1979) is a Kazakhstani professional ice hockey defenceman. He was a member of the Kazakhstan men's national ice hockey team at the 2006 Winter Olympics. He also has Russian citizenship.

International
Blokhin was named to the Kazakhstan men's national ice hockey team for competition at the 2014 IIHF World Championship.

Career statistics

Regular season and playoffs

International

References

External links

1979 births
Living people
Barys Nur-Sultan players
Dizel Penza players
HC Dynamo Moscow players
HC Izhstal players
HC Lada Togliatti players
Metallurg Novokuznetsk players
HC MVD players
HC Neftekhimik Nizhnekamsk players
HC Sibir Novosibirsk players
HC Yugra players
Ice hockey players at the 2006 Winter Olympics
Kazakhmys Satpaev players
Kazakhstani ice hockey defencemen
Kazakhstani people of Russian descent
Olympic ice hockey players of Kazakhstan
Sportspeople from Oskemen
Asian Games gold medalists for Kazakhstan
Medalists at the 2011 Asian Winter Games
Asian Games medalists in ice hockey
Ice hockey players at the 2011 Asian Winter Games